Kuala Lumpur Butterfly Park (Malay: Taman Rama Rama Kuala Lumpur) is a public butterfly zoo in Kuala Lumpur, Malaysia which is located adjacent to the Lake Gardens and Kuala Lumpur Bird Park.

References

External links 

 Homepage of the Kuala Lumpur Butterfly Park

Buildings and structures in Kuala Lumpur
Butterfly houses
Zoos in Malaysia
Tourist attractions in Kuala Lumpur
Parks in Malaysia
Zoos established in 1992